Stephen Borthwick may refer to:

Steve Borthwick (born 1979), English rugby player and coach

Stephen Borthwick (schoolmaster) (1951–2020), English school principal